Taverne di Corciano is a frazione in Corciano, Umbria, Italy.

Frazioni of Corciano